The Albanian Civil War in 1997 was sparked by pyramid scheme failures in Albania soon after its transition to a market economy. The government was toppled and more than 2,000 people were killed. Various other sources also describe the violence that ensued as a rebellion, or a rebellion that gradually escalated into a civil war.

By January 1997, Albanian citizens, who had lost a total of $1.2 billion, took their protest to the streets. Beginning in February, thousands of citizens launched daily protests demanding reimbursement by the government, which they believed was profiting from the schemes. On 1 March, Prime Minister Aleksandër Meksi resigned and on 2 March, President Sali Berisha declared a state of emergency.

On 11 March the Socialist Party of Albania won a major victory when its leader, Bashkim Fino, was appointed prime minister. However, the transfer of power did not halt the unrest, and protests spread to northern Albania. Although the government quelled revolts in the north, the ability of the government and military to maintain order began to collapse, especially in the southern half of Albania, which fell under the control of rebels and criminal gangs.

All major population centres were engulfed in demonstrations by 13 March and foreign countries began to evacuate their citizens. These evacuations included Operation Libelle, Operation Silver Wake and Operation Kosmas, by the German, American and Greek militaries respectively. The United Nations Security Council, in Resolution 1101, authorised a force of 7,000 troops on 28 March to direct relief efforts and restore order in Albania. The UN feared the unrest would spread beyond Albania's borders and send refugees throughout Europe. On 15 April, a multi-national peacekeeping force launched Operation Alba which helped restore rule of law in the country by late July.

After the rebellion had ended, some of the weapons looted from Albanian army barracks and stockpiles were acquired by the Kosovo Liberation Army, with many making their way to the ensuing Kosovo War (1998–99).

Terminology 
The period has been asserted as a civil war, brink of civil war, and a near civil war, and anarchy, while others claim that it was not.

Causes 
In 1992, the Democratic Party of Albania won the nation's first free elections and Sali Berisha became president. In the mid-1990s Albania was adopting a market economy, after decades of a planned economy under the People's Socialist Republic of Albania. The rudimentary financial system soon became dominated by Ponzi schemes, and even government officials endorsed a series of pyramid investment funds.

By January 1997, the schemes, many of which were fronts for money laundering and arms trafficking, could no longer make payments, which led to their collapse. By then, the number of investors who had been lured by the promise of getting rich quick grew to include two-thirds of Albania's 3 million population. It is estimated that close to $1.5 billion was invested in companies offering monthly interest rates ranging from 10%–25%, while the average monthly income in the country was around $80. A significant number of Albanians had sold their homes to invest, and emigrants working in Greece and Italy transferred additional resources to the schemes.

1996 elections 

On 26 May 1996, general elections were held and the conservative Democratic Party won by a large margin, winning 122 out of 140 seats in Parliament. However, the opposition Socialists (PS) accused the government of election fraud and rejected the results. They proceeded to leave the ballot-counting process and boycott the parliament. Five months later, local elections were held on 20 October. The Democratic Party won again, but the Socialists rejected this result as well.

Pyramid schemes 

The pyramid schemes started operations in 1991. Their activity was based on making payments to old investors using money contributed by new investors. The first scheme was that of Hajdin Sejdisë, who later fled to Switzerland with several million dollars. It was followed by "Sudja" of shoe factory worker Maksude Kadëna in 1993, then the "Populli" foundations run by an opposition politician, and "Xhaferri". By the end of 1996 the schemes peaked. The interest rates they offered were very tempting; Sudja offered 100% interest.

The schemes were not criticised immediately because of a banking law adopted in 1994 which, on International Monetary Fund (IMF) advice, contained no provision that the National Bank of Albania act as a supervisor of commercial banks. The IMF changed that advice two years later, after the consequences had become visible. Despite IMF advice to shut down these schemes, the government continued to allow them, often participating in them.

Between 8–16 January 1997 the schemes finally collapsed. On 22 January the government froze the Xhaferri and Populli firms. "Gjallica", another firm, was on the verge of bankruptcy, while "Vefa", which had invested in Albanian hotels, fuel industry and factories, continued as usual.

The first public protests occurred on 16 January in the south of the country. On 19 January, demonstrators protested in capital Tirana over the Sudja scheme. On 24 January the open rebellion de facto began. Thousands of people in the western town of Lushnjë marched on city hall in protest against the government's support of the schemes, and the protest quickly descended into violence. Police forces were subsequently routed and the city hall and the adjoining cinema were burned down.

One day later, on 25 January, leader of the Democratic Party, Tritan Shehu, was sent to Lushnjë to resolve the situation. On his arrival he was captured by protesters and held hostage for several hours at the City Stadium where he was assaulted as well. Albanian Special Forces units intervened to extract Shehu. By the morning of 26 January every government institution in the city had been looted and destroyed, except for the Interior Ministry building, which was protected by the Director of Communications, seven of his engineers, and a guard who refused to abandon his post.

On 26–27 January violence erupted in other southern towns, including the major port city of Vlorë. On 30 January the Forum for Democracy was formed by opposition parties to try and lead the protests. Anger was also directed against President Sali Berisha and the government for allowing the schemes to continue despite IMF advice. As allegations grew that Berisha and others in the government had personally profited from the schemes, many became convinced that the Democratic Party had to be removed by force. This was especially true in Vlorë.

On 4 February the government began distributing reimbursements of some of the lost money at subsidiaries of the state-owned National Commercial Bank. Rather than quelling the protests, the move backfired as it increased the public's suspicions. A check for $550,000 paid by the "Gjallica" firm on 7 January to the Socialist Party accelerated the firm's collapse. On 5 February Gjallica declared bankruptcy and on 6 February violent protests resumed in Vlorë. On 9 February state police were attacked in Vlorë and a day later, also in the south, a group of 50 Special Forces troops attacked and brutally dispersed protesters.

Hunger strike at the University of Vlora 
On 20 February 1997, about 50 students at the University of Vlorë began a hunger strike on campus; they demanded the government's resignation and the full return of invested money. On 22 February, the opposition Forum for Democracy declared its support for the strike. Students from the towns of Gjirokastër and Elbasan also came to give their support. They were then brought by the FRESSH (Youth Wing of Socialist Party) activists from Vlorë to capital Tirana. In contrast, the students of University Luigj Gurakuqi in Shkodër did not take part in the protest, and its Students Union declared that although "the students share the pain of the citizens of Vlorë in losing money in pyramid schemes, on the other hand, they think that freedom and democracy, homeland and nation, have a higher price".

On 26 February thousands of people surrounded the building of the university in Vlorë to defend it from a rumored attack by SHIK (Shërbimi Informativ Kombëtar), the national intelligence service. The same day a group of strikers requested more medical help, raising doubts about the doctors near them. On 27 February in Shkodër, mayor Bahri Borici of the United Right declared his support for the hunger strike.

The next day was a decisive moment in Albanian history—after strengthening their perimeter around the building of the university, the rebel forces, without warning, attacked the SHIK building. In fighting between the rebels and government forces, nine people—six officers and three civilians—were killed. This incident marked the start of a ten-day civil war and a year of violence in southern Albania.

Looting and opening of weapon depots
 
The so-called opening of the depots refers to the opening of army's weapons depots on orders of President Berisha in the northern areas of the country, which he justified by the need to protect the population against the violence from the south.

When southern Albanian bases were looted, it was estimated that, on average, every male from the age of ten upwards had at least one firearm and ample ammunition. During the rebellion 656,000 weapons of various types and 1.5 billion rounds of ammunition, 3.5 million hand grenades and one million land mines, were looted from army depots according to UNDP.

At the village of Selitë near Burrel, a town 90 km north of capital Tirana, an explosion occurred at an arms depot on 29 April after a group of villagers broke into the facility. The blast resulted in the deaths of 22 of the 200 village residents, most of the victims coming from the same family.

Treasury robberies
The Krrabë Event was the theft of gold of the Albanian state treasury on 24 April 1997. The  treasury, hidden in tunnels near Krrabë outside Tirana, consisted of 340 kg of gold ingots, banknotes, and other items. The perpetrators, who were later tried and received prison sentences, were: Arian Bishqemi (7 years), Blerim Haka (3 years), Pellumb Dalti (6 years), Enver Hyka (8 years) and Ahmet Hyken (4 years).

The Robbery of the Northern State Treasury was the theft of approximately $6 million from the Albanian state treasury in Shkodër in March 1997. A group of six people attacked the fortified building of the State Treasury with an antitank weapon. The total amount of money that was inside the building was $8 million, but the robbers only managed to get away with $6 million. The few police still in the city soon arrived at the scene and took control of the remaining assets.

Later, the thieves were seen by several witnesses meeting at the outskirts of Shkodër, where they divided the money between themselves. After the robbery, the police and investigators began investigations in Shkodër. In the spring of 1998, more than a year later, the investigators closed the file and it was given to the police for further investigation. The perpetrators of this crime are still unknown to this day.

International intervention 
On 28 March the United Nations adopted Resolution 1101 for humanitarian aid to Albania, and on 15 April Operation Alba forces began to arrive, finally withdrawing on 12 August. About 7,000 soldiers in the multinational Italian-led UN mission came to Albania to restore order and rule of law. The first forces were deployed in Durrës. Normality first returned to Tirana. An element of the Operation Alba forces stayed in place, retraining the military to modern standards; this unit was joined from mid-May by members of WEU's Multinational Albanian Police element, doing the same with the police after restructuring the legislative base which caused the problem.

Involved were:
  Greek Armed Forces (Operation Alba, Operation Kosmas) led by Lt Col Dimitrios Tzimanis
  Italian Armed Forces (Operation Alba)
  Romanian Armed Forces (Operation Alba)
  Turkish Armed Forces (Operation Alba)
  Austrian Armed Forces (Operation Alba)
  French Armed Forces (Operation Alba)
  German Armed Forces (Operation Libelle) led by Col Henning Glawatz
  United States Armed Forces (Operation Silver Wake)

UN resolutions

Evacuation operations

Peacekeeping

As part of peacekeeping operations, Italy sent 7,000 soldiers, France 850, Greece 803 soldiers, Turkey 500, Romania 400, Germany 100 and Austria 100 soldiers.

Snap elections

Armed groups

Gangs

Taking advantage of the difficult situations, criminal groups armed themselves and took control of entire cities. Most leaders had been imprisoned in Greece, but suddenly escaped and returned to Albania. The most famous case is that of Zani Caushi, who escaped from the high-security prison of Larissa in February 1997 and, with a group of friends, established the gang of Çole in Vlora.

In Vlora five gangs were created, but two ruled the city: the gang of Zani and the gang of Gaxhai. Movement in the city started at 10:00, when people gathered in Flag's Square to hear the Committee of Rescue, and ended at 13:00. After that hour the streets were deserted and the only people who moved were gang members. Gangs announced through speakers and flyers that other people were not to go out as there would be fighting.

Each night brought attacks with explosives and shooting, leaving dozens dead. In Berat Altin Dardha's rule was even more severe. In Lushnje Aldo Bare's gang had control. The worst crime that this gang committed was to behead an opponent. Cities ruled by gangs were Vlora, Berat, Tepelena, Memaliaj, Ballshi, Saranda, Gjirokastra, Lushnja, Pogradec, Cerrik and Tropoja.
 Gang of Çole, in Vlora, led by Myrteza Çaushi, known as "Partizan" and "Zani". Named after Çole neighbourhood, in the eastern part of the city, which it controlled. Supported SP.
 Kakami, in Vlora, led by Fredi Nehbiu. Controlled western district of Babice.
 Gang of Gaxhai, in Vlora, led by Gazmend "Gaxhai" Braka. Named after leader. Members were from Cerkovinë, the city of Vlora and other southern cities, and was formed in March 1997 in Vlora. Their main rivals were the Çole. Supported DP.
 Gang of Muko, in Vlora.
 Gang of Altin Dardha, in Berat, led by Altin Dardha.
 Gang of Aldo Bare, in Lushnje, led by Aldo Bare.

Salvation Committees
Salvation Committees (also known as People's Committees or the Committee of Public Salvation []) were organizations created during the 1997 Albanian Civil War. They were established in many regions of the country in order to usurp the functions of the Albanian state. They were most influential in the south, where early in the crisis the local Salvation Committees merged to form the National Salvation Committee and demanded the removal of President Sali Berisha.

Many committees were based on local organisations for the Socialist Party of Albania and saw themselves as protectors of democracy against authoritarian one-man rule. The Albanian government viewed them as similar to Communist-era local party organisations and therefore a potential threat of returning to Communist rule.

Timeline

January 

 8–16 January: Multiple pyramid schemes fail: "Kamberi", "Cenaj", "Silva", "Malvasia", "Kambo", "Grunjasi", "Dypero", "Bashkimi", "Beno", "Pogoni", "B&G", "Kobuzi", "Arkond", "Adelin", "A.Delon", "Agi", "M.Leka Company", "Global Limited Co.", "Çashku" and "Sudja". City of Vlora hit, as the main center of such schemes. Government froze the assets of "Vefa Holding" and "Gjallica".
 15 January : Hundreds gathered at the palace where Maksude Kadëna, owner of "Sudes", lived. Among them were the leaders of the opposition. They confronted the police.
 16 January: Maksude Kadëna, owner of "Sude", arrested. The Socialist newspaper "Voice of the People" wrote, "From Tirana to Vlora across the country in revolt", referring to about 6000 vlonjate protests held in the Flag Square.
 18 January: An emergency meeting of the Democratic National Council created a parliamentary committee to investigate.
 19 January: A protest against "Sudes" held in the Square. Opposition leaders attempted to lead the protest against the government.
 20 January: 1500 people gather at bankrupt scheme "People-Xhaferri Democracy" to get their money.
 22 January: Trial begins against "charitable donations" (in fact, pyramid schemes) "People's Democracy-Xhaferri" and "People" both directed by people with close ties to Communist State Security (Rrapush Xhaferri and Bashkim Driza). Kërxhaliu, administrator of "Gjallicës", was arrested.
 23 January: Police arrested 50 employees of "People" and "Xhaferri". The newspaper "Albania" wrote, "Surely that is the work by Hajdin Sejdia. He left with several million dollars in 1991 but returned unexpectedly in 1996 and began to distribute money to creditors. The truth is that he received $3 million from 'Xhaferri' and 'People' and this led to increased confidence of citizens in these schemes . . . a result of Sejdisë's arrival [was] an increase of some tens of millions of dollars in deposits of citizens to these schemes within 2–3 months. This avoided the premature failure of these schemes."
 24 January: Lushnja City Hall and a cinema were burned by demonstrators angry about the arrest of Xhaferri.
 25 January: Demonstrators came from villages surrounding Lushnja to burn and destroy any state institution in Lushnje. Tritan Shehu was held hostage for several hours at the City Stadium. City of Lushnje was burned by the crowd led by local SP leaders. Other clashes take place in Elbasan, Memaliaj, Laç, Kuçovë.
 26 January: A demonstration of the Socialist Party in downtown Tirana degenerated into a violent clash between police and opposition supporters. Some socialist leaders were injured by police. The opposition destroyed the National History Museum, the Palace of Culture, Et'hem Bey Mosque and the Municipality of South Tiranës. An angry mob burned the city hall. Albpetrol was burned in Patos by terrorist groups.
 27 January: An angry crowd burned the hall of Peshkopi and the police station. Four policemen were seriously injured.
 29 January: Police arrested 140 people in Berat and 20 in Poliçan for involvement in violent demonstrations and illegal activities.
 30 January: The Forum for Democracy was formed by opposition parties, led by Daut Gumeni, Fatos Lubonja from the Albanian Helsinki Committee (AHC was known for anti-Berisha positions) and Kurt Kola, president of the Association of the Politically Persecuted (also indebted to "the people"). Soon this "Forum" began organizing anti-government protests.
 31 January: The newspaper Koha Jonë asked the creditors of "Gjallicës" to go to the firm to get money on 6 February. The aim was to promote violent demonstrations at "Gjallica".

February 
 4 February: Partial returns of deposits began based on a government decision. The opposition criticised Democrats for delaying the start of the process. "Forum for Democracy" proposes the creation of a technical government to resolve the crisis.
 5 February: The bankrupt firm "Gjallica" was taken over by the former State Security. The cities most affected by the bankruptcy of the firm are Vlora ($145 million U.S.) and Kukes ($16 million U.S.). Protests begin in Vlora.
 6 February: Thousands join violent protests in Vlora. Kukes formed a "Committee" with the firm's creditors and is seeking a legal solution to this issue. They seek to become shareholders of this firm. Similar committees established in Gjirokastra and Berat.
 7 February: Protesters block road in Memaliaj.
 8 February: Continued anti-government protests in Vlora.
 9 February: Police station in Vlora attacked by armed crowd, casualties include one dead and one injured. "Forum for Democracy" declares that the only solution of the crisis is through protests against the government.
 10 February: Violence continued in the South. DPA headquarters were burned by armed groups. President and government resigned. A group of about 50 Special Forces troops were viciously attacked by a mob of thousands. EuroNews broadcast footage of the police siege. The rebellion spread throughout southern Albania. A state of emergency was proposed in the South.
 11 February: Artur Rustemi, the first victim of the rebellion, was buried in Vlora. His funeral turned into an anti-government demonstration that burned ADP headquarters in Vlora. Alarm spread over the lack of bread in the city. The "Forum for Democracy" called for dialogue with President Berisha kuzhtëzuar.
 12–15 February: Multiple kidnappings occurred. Schools closed and shops were allowed to sell up to 9 o'clock.
 13 February: Kurt Kola was accused as a traitor and collaborator with communist executioners.
 14 February: Anti-government protests develop in Fier.
 17 February: The Legality Movement condemned the violence and refused dialogue with the "Forum for Democracy." Ministers meet in Tirana.
 18 February: President Berisha met with citizens of Lushnja. He promised to do everything to resolve the crisis. The National Front sought resignation of the government.
 20 February: Hunger strike began at University Ismail Kamal of Vlora. Approximately 50 students joined the strike and demanded the resignation of the government. Forum for Democracy organised a violent demonstration in Tirana in which five policemen were seriously injured. A group of students met with President Berisha in Vlora and agreed to resolve the crisis peacefully.
 22 February: Trial began of leaders of the Gjallicës. Forum for Democracy supported student hunger strike in Vlora.
 24 February: Angry crowds attack state institutions in the south.
 26 February: As part of the Presidential tour of areas affected by the crisis, Berisha met citizens of Gjirokaster and promised to make all efforts to resolve the crisis. Thousands surrounded University Ismail Kamal to protect against a rumored "attack" by state forces.
 28 February: Forty-six students joined a University of Gjirokastra hunger strike. Their demands were similar to those of students in Vlora. Armed crowds attacked and burned a SHIK branch—three agents burned to death in the fire while three others were attacked and killed by the crowd. Three members of the crowd were also killed.

March 
 1 March: The city of Vlora had no functioning government. Vlora was controlled by gangs and traffickers, and mass exodus began. In Lushnje police were brutally beaten. News of massacre of SHIK officers shook the government. Rebels took control of the Albanian Navy Pasha Liman Base, a state symbol of resistance. The government reacted by declaring a state of emergency and sent more troops to areas around Vlora and the town of Tepelena. In response, rebels set up cannons at the entrance of the city and pointed them towards Tirana. A massive explosion destroyed an arms storage facility. Himarë was burning, including police buildings in Gjirokastra.
 2 March: Alexander Meksi's government resigned after failing to resolve the crisis. The event was celebrated in Vlora and the south by thousands firing AK-47s into the air as a sign of victory. Parliament approved the chief of Gazideden Union to restore order. Immediately Gazidede ordered indefinite closure of schools throughout the country and imposed restrictions on the press and consumer goods. In Kavaja, bastion of PD, over 5000 people voluntarily armed to defend the city from an envisioned attack by armed gangs. Italian news agency ANSA commented: "The whole scenario is emerging as a politico-military strategy and not as a manifestation of spontaneous popular. To gather people in the Flag Square are available for days special machines."
 3 March: President Berisha was re-elected with the votes of DP members of the parliament alone. This led to massive riots in southern and central Albania. The remaining warehouses exploded and remaining bands of the military formed committees. The city of Saranda was also captured by rebels, with fighters based out of Vlora arriving by boat and burning every government building in the city, including the library. In Vlora, a local detention facility was broken into and more than 400 guns were seized. Gunmen burned down the Vocational Training Centre in Vlora. Meanwhile, SHIK tried to contain the rebellion to Vlora, Saranda and Delvina to stop it from spreading to the rest of the country. Destruction and killings continued throughout southern Albania. The seven million dollar Vocational Training Centre in Vlora was burned, which had cost the Albanian government. A group of approximately 100-member "Adipetrol" was held responsible and their compound in Gjirokastra was raided. Masked raiders captured a warship and rebels attacked Saranda, where police and government buildings were burned. Criminals engineered a prison break, releasing hundreds of prisoners, seized 400 weapons and set fire to the town library. In Kuçovë, a bread shortage was announced. The army recovered control of Fier and  began to disarm the population.
 4 March: The Committee of Public Salvation was formed in Vlore, headed by Albert Shyti. This committee began to act as a parallel government. Snipers occupied every building in Vlore and every street put up barricades to prevent attacks by SHIK. The Mifoli Bridge over the River Vjosë was blocked and mined (this bridge—which separated the two parts of Albania—would become a symbol of the rebellion). As students ended their hunger strike, gunmen in Saranda used navy craft to plunder weapons caches. Gangs patrolled the sea using Albanian Navy ships. Outside Saranda one member of SHIK was burnt alive and another was taken hostage, while two others escaped. Fifty soldiers joined the rebels and two Albanian Air Force pilots defected and flew their planes to Italy. The pilots claimed they were ordered to attack civilians. Gazidede's plan to isolate the insurgency in Vlora failed, as it spread across the south. After fierce fighting in Delvina, the rebels forced the army to pull back. In Saranda, the rebels put up roadblocks. In the South, more depots exploded. Rebels placed snipers in mansions, locked the Mifolit bridge and raised barricades to prevent entry of the military and SHIK. In Shkodra, the army capitulated and the hunger strike ended. In Saranda, organised gangs raided an Albanian Navy base  and captured thousands of weapons. The Public Salvation Committee of Vlore was formed. It began to act as a parallel government by conducting a "de facto" coup. Its leader was Albert Shyti. The main collaborator of the "Committee" was Myrteza Caushi, known as Zani "The strongman of Vlora". Under the example of  Vlora, Shyti created "Salvation Committees" everywhere in Albania. Demonstrators would never have succeeded in overpowering the Vlora police if they had not been armed and organised by local organised crime bosses and former members of the Communist-era secret police (Sigurimi), who saw this as their chance to damage the new political system. Typical of the latter was Albert Shyti, who returned from Greece with a private arsenal and set himself up as the head of the Vlora "Salvation Committees"—a pattern replicated in other towns and cities in southern Albania.
 5 March: Warehouses in Memaliaj and other places were blown up. Rebels burned police buildings in these cities. Greek TV "Mega" stated, "Today, armed groups in southern Albania raised the banner of Northern Epirus for the first time. They demand the separation of the southern part from the rest of the country, ranging from Tepelena, thus proclaiming the autonomy of southern Albania. Albania's longstanding problem has been that of North-South autonomy, which is divided along the Shkumbin river."
 6 March: President Berisha held a meeting with representatives of political parties to sign a statement, condemning the massive plunder and destruction of military warehouses and calling for surrender of weapons. Six hours later, the SP and DAP leaders denied any responsibility and obligation towards the statement that they had earlier described as a "political success". Greek TV "Sky" News stated, "A few minutes have emerged from the meeting the leaders of armed groups of Saranda, who have decided to attack tonight at  Gjirokastra. They will not leave and anxiously await today's popular trial will be done with three prisoners captured in the main square of Sarande, who allegedly attacked SHIK employees and northern ethnics that increases the balance of victims in Vlora."
 7 March: The rebels from Saranda, in collaboration with local army forces, entered Gjirokastra and took some Albanian Special Forces troops hostage. The leaders of the revolt in Gjirokastra were members of PAD, Arben Imami (appointed Defence Minister later in 2009) and Ridvan Pëshkëpia. With the fall of Gjirokastra, the entire south of the country was out of government control. Weapons continued to spread across the country. Tirana's Rinas International Airport was attacked by villagers from the surrounding area, and the Agricultural University of Tirana was looted. Albanian Army soldiers defected to rebels in Gjirokastra. Military assets were taken by gangs and the city's military committee. With  Gjirokastra in the hands of rebels, the entire south of the country was out of control. Weapons continued to spread. National Rinas Airport was attacked by villagers from the surrounding areas.
 8 March: President Berisha organised a meeting with all parties concerned with the creation of the new government. Leaders of the Gjirokastra division were vetëdorëzuar and had taken the lead of rebellion in this city. Gangs kidnapped a number of auxiliary military forces of Tirana and had blocked several tanks and a helicopter. At midnight attack and spoiled milk processing factory in Libohova.
 9 March: A Government of National Reconciliation Union was created in Tirana, headed by Gjirokastra mayor Bashkim Fino. The new government called on former army members to contribute to restoring peace and order. President Berisha appeared on VAT in a statement to the nation where he called for "reconciliation, faith, unity and calmness".
 10 March: In Gramsh rebels attacked the police building, and took control of Fier's streets. Berat fell into the hands of gangs and became the main centre of rebellion after Vlora. Poliçan, Këlcyra and Skrapari fell. In Kuçovë rebels took control of 19 MiGs. "Vlora Rescue Committee" welcomed the agreement of 9 March. American Foundation for Eastern Europe directed a letter to the Albanian Embassy in America stating, "It's great naivety not understand that the Committee of Vlora and its leaders are inspired by communist mafia-type the KGB."  Letters to the conclusion stated: "Mr. Berisha must decide by any means the rule of law, using military force may even". On the evening of 10 March, the U.S. Embassy welcomed the agreement. Unopposed on the battlefield, rebels in the south launched a wave of extraordinary destruction. In Gramsh they attacked a local police station; in Fier they took control of the streets. Berat fell into the hands of gangs and became one of the main centres of rebellion. Poliçan and Këlcyra were taken over by criminal gangs. In Kuçovë rebels took control of 19 Soviet-made MiG combat aircraft. The rebellion spread to the north.
 11 March: Birth of the "Committee of the South" that rejected Berisha and the return of lost money. If the Committee proposed the formation of a new state separate from Tirana. Army depots in Kukës were looted and scores of armed looters damaged state institutions. The citizens of Kukes abandon the town for one day due to an announcement that the Serbian army had crossed the border. The revolt spread to the north, the army capitulated everywhere and a huge weapons depot was captured in Shkodra. Prominent organised-crime figures escaped from prison and put together gangs, effectively taking control of many areas. Gangs looted banks, took hostages and robbed businesses. The chaos was complete and the whole country (with the exception of the capital, Tirana) was completely paralysed.
 12 March: President Berisha decreed a Government of National Reconciliation. Revolt broke out in the South.
 13 March: President Berisha and Prime Minister Fino requested international military assistance. Tirana was on the verge of invasion by the rebels. Curfew was declared. Several hundred volunteers mainly from the North, protected the capital. Berisha experienced what he felt was the most dangerous night of his life. The last to emerge from prison are Fatos Nano and Ramiz Alia. More revolts in the South. In Lezha rebels burned a police building. Ismail Kadare appeared in a message the Albanians in the Voice of America. He stated, "The clock was turned back in Albania's civil war between the nationalists and communists in the years 1943–44". He criticised foreign media and political elite, and calling on his compatriots calm to overcome the crisis. The French news agency Air France Press claimed, "The riots in Albania were a military coup."
 14 March: Franz Vranitski was appointed to solve the Albanian crisis. The US Ambassador appeared on VAT, stating that its diplomatic mission will not leave and that the American people supported the Albanian people. In Tirana, the population began to disarm. A tobacco plantation and a Coca-Cola factory were attacked. The SHIK chief resigned. Rebels occupied the port of Durrës.
 15 March: Rinas airport was recovered by the government. Parliament approved the "Government of National Reconciliation." A "Committee for the Protection of Durres" was formed.
 16 March: A massive rally in Tirana called for peace and cooperation. A day of national mourning in honor of victims of the rebellion was decreed. In Fier radioactive material was looted. President Berisha decreed amnesty for 51 prisoners.
 17 March: A Presidential decree released Fatos Nano, opposition leader jailed since 1993 on charges of corruption. The President left the country in a U.S. military helicopter. Fatos Nano held a press conference stating his support for the new government.
 18 March: A Committee for the Rescue of North and Middle Albania threatened the new government if it recognised the committees of the South. As a result, the government did not recognise any committees.
 20 March: The Assembly of Public Salvation Committee demanded the removal of Berisha and proposed the creation of Federation of South. Rinas Airport reopened.
 21 March: Greece sought to enter Albanian territory on the pretext of protecting minorities. Berisha requests Turkish military aid. The Turkish government states that if Greek troops entered Albania, then Turkey would immediately invade Greece and capture Athens. The Turkish government demanded that the mistakes made in Bosnia not be repeated in Albania. The head of Gazidede Union, at a hearing in the Albanian Parliament accused anti-Albanian Greek circles, Albanian Socialists, military and criminals. He stated, "The integrity of Albania no longer exists" and "the rebellion was directed towards the destruction of any historic and cultural facility, with long-term goal to eradicate any historical evidence autoktonitetit the Albanians".
 22 March: Armed gangs rule Saranda and Gjirokastra under a regime of violence and terror. Dozens of people were killed.
 23 March: Control of the Port of Durrës was reestablished. Berat was ruled by gangs. Numerous attacks were attempted attacks with explosives.
 25 March: 3 policemen were killed in Vlore.
 26 March: Called back to parliament, former chief of Gazidede Union points to a Greek government plan called "Lotos", which had the goal of "Liberation Vorio-Epirus by the Albanian side rule of an armed rebellion". He accused Greece and the U.S. as well as Nicholas Gage (accused of financing the massacre of Pëshkëpisë) as sponsoring this plan. He also accused Kico Mustaqin, former commander of the army and Gramoz Ruci of giving secret information to ASFALISË (the Greek Secret Service) concerning the organisation of the Albanian Army.
 27 March: The Democratic Party claimed that relations between Greek and Albanian peoples had always been excellent and the Greek extremist groups did not represent all Greek people.

 28 March: Otranto tragedy. In the Otranto channel an Albanian ship run by a Vlora gang was rammed and sunk by an Italian naval vessel by mistake. 82 refugees died. A "National Assembly of Committees of the South" was held. Opposition political figures participated. They demanded the President's resignation. They rejected the "Government of National Reconciliation." The leaders of these committees were former exponents of the Enver Hoxha regime. In the village of Levan, the biggest massacre of the affair occurred. 24 people were killed by clashes between roma and a gang. A total of over 110 died. United Nations adopted resolution no. 1101 for humanitarian aid.
 29 March: 5 were killed in South and Berat.
 30 March: President Berisha and Prime Minister Fino sent condolences to the families of Otranto victims. Albania requested an international investigation of Otranto.
 31 March: Proclamation of national mourning in honour of the Otranto victims. Ismail Kadare stated in Italian media, "it is shocked by this tragedy and that the authority of government and the President need to Resume in place."

April 
 1 April: Leaders of the Democratic Party debated the resignation of Berisha and Shehu. Fino urged the Socialist Party to withdraw from the 28 March agreement with the Committee of the South.
 3 April: Police made gains in restoring order in Tirana. Special Forces take control of Berat.
 4 April: U.S. Embassy states that it would not meet with any Salvation Committee and that the only legitimate institutions are the government and president.
 5 April: Armed gangs rule Pogradec.
 7 April: Dozens of people in Fier had been wounded and 5 killed, including two children. The Haklaj family led the riots. 3 were killed in Durrës.
 8 April: In Gramsh clashes broke out between local gangs and another from Laçi. The city had become a center of arms sales.
 12 April: Leka Zog arrived in Tirana, along with the royal court. Dozens of mentally ill escape from Elbasan.
 13 April: Italian Prime Minister Romano Prodi visited Vlore with Albanian Zani Çaushi as his bodyguard.
 15 April: "Alba Mission", an international army of 7000 troops under the direction of Italy began to arrive in Albania. The first forces deployed in Durrës. Normality returned to Tirana. Held a successful operation to apprehend criminals Gramsh and collecting looted weapons.
 17 April: Political parties agreed to hold elections on 29 June.
 18 April: A bomb exploded in the courtyard of the University of Elbasan.
 19 April: A repository rocket explodes in Gjirokastra. Fino met with Leka Zog.
 21 April: Multinational forces deployed in Vlora. Criminal gangs attacked and spoiled the city of Gramsh and terrorized citizens in Çorovodë.
 22 April: A bomb exploded near ex local "Flora" in Tirana.
 23 April: International forces choose not to work with any "committee of the South."
 24 April: Police Station Attacked in Elbasan. Leka Zog visited Vlore.
 26 April: Council of Europe demanded the disarmament of "illegal" Salvation Committees. 4 children injured by a bomb in Gjirokastra. In Shpërthehen 35 meters of train tracks were demolished.
 28 April: In Lushnje, a crowd of roughly 4,000 gathered to protest. The protest was initiated by the Committee of Public Salvation. Demands included Berisha's resignation, reform of the electoral process, emergency parliamentary elections then scheduled for 2001, and reimbursement of 100% of all financial losses. Leaders of the Committee joined the rally.
 29 April: Schools reopened in the North. Vlora continued under the power of the gangs.
 30 April: 27 people left dead by the explosion of a weapons depot in Burrel. Three warehouses exploded in Berat.

May 
 4 May: Dozens were killed in Shkodra, Berat, Tirana and Durrës.
 10 May: Special Forces struggled with armed gangs in Gramsh. Gramsh Rescue Committee prevented distribution of newspapers in the city.
 14 May: Kakavisë attacked the border. Remains blocked the Berat-Lushnje road. A military post was attacked in Berat.
 15 May: A warehouse in Gjirokastra exploded, injuring 14 people and killing 4 others. An entire family was killed in Pogradec.
 19 May: Violence continued in the south. Killings continued in Vlora. In Memaliaj police and Rescue Committee joined forces against one of the gangs.
 21 May: Continued attacks against bridges in Gjirokastra. Violence continued in Saranda, Vlora, Shkodra and Durrës.
 23 May: In Cërrik city gangs attacked a Special Forces armored vehicle. 6 effective Special Forces of the Garda e Republikës were killed by grenade attacks. 3 others captured hostage.

June
 17 June: Massacre of Ura Vajgurore.
 ? June: The Democrat leadership was unable to operate a normal campaign in southern Albania. Their campaign was accompanied by riots in those cities, leaving behind more than 60 people killed.
 29 June: Parliamentary elections were held. Socialist Party allies won while the Democrats suffered the biggest loss in their history. Many of the members of the "Salvation Committees" came out for leftist candidates though they promised they would not get a government position without resolving the crisis. On election day a referendum was held over the form of governance. The Republic prevailed over monarchy with 65% of the votes.

July 
 3 July: Pretender to the throne of the abolished monarchy King Leka I organised a demonstration accusing the electoral commission of rigging the results of the referendum in which two thirds of voters rejected the proposed restoration of monarchy. Five people were killed in a clash between demonstrators and police.
 July: Gangs continue to rule cities with fear and terror. Murders, robberies and trafficking of weapons, people and drugs increased.
 24 July: Berisha resigned. He had promised that if the Socialists won he would leave because they could not endure "institutional cohabitation" with them. The national assembly elected Rexhep Meidani as the new president. Massive gunfire in Tirana celebrated Berisha's resignation. Major fighting ended.

August 
 11 August: Operation Alba's military forces left the country.

Casualties
According to Christopher Jarvis, there were 2,000 killed. According to Fred C. Abrahams, between March and May 1997 some 1,600 people were killed, most in shootouts between rival gangs. An UNIDIR document claimed more than 2,000 killed in March alone.

Aftermath
Damage from the rebellion was estimated at US$200 million dollars and some 3,700 to 5,000 wounded. Lawsuits were filed against the bosses of the rogue firms. Various members of the government, including Safet Zhulali and Agim Shehu, were sentenced in absentia.

In elections in June and July 1997, Berisha and his party were voted out of power, and the leftist coalition headed by the Socialist Party won. The Socialist party elected Rexhep Meidani as President of the Albanian Republic. All UN forces left Albania by 11 August.

See also
 List of massacres in Albania
 Kosovo War

References

Sources

 
 
 
 
 
 
 “Rënia e Demokracisë”, Afrim Krasniqi, 1998, Eurorilindja
 “Unë e pashë kush e dogji Vlorën”, Gëzim Zilja, 2000, Pelioni
 Fondi Monetar Ndërkombëtar, Ngritja dhe rënia e piramidave shqiptare
 Impakti i piramidave në Shqipëri
 Piramidat shqiptare
 Banka Botërore, Shqipëria nën hijen e skemave piramidale

Further reading

 
 
 Perlmutter, T., 1998. The politics of proximity: The Italian response to the Albanian crisis. International Migration Review, pp. 203–222.
 Schmidt, F., 1998. Upheaval in Albania. Current History, 97, p. 127.
 Kalra, M.S., 1998. Inflation and money demand in Albania (No. 98-101). International Monetary Fund.
 Miall, H., 1997. The OSCE role in Albania: A Success for Conflict Prevention. Helsinki Monitor, 8, p. 74.
 Nicholson, B., 1999. The beginning of the end of a rebellion: southern Albania, May–June 1997. East European Politics and Societies, 13(3), pp. 543–565.
 Kritsiotis, D., 1999. Security Council Resolution 1101 (1997) and the Multinational Protection Force of Operation Alba in Albania. Leiden Journal of International Law, 12(3), pp. 511–547.
 Jarvis, 1999, "The Rise and Fall of the Pyramid Schemes in Albania," IMF Working Paper 99/98 (International Monetary Fund: Washington)
 Jarvis, C., March 2000. The rise and fall of the pyramid schemes in Albania. Finance & Development, 37(1).
 Foster, E., 1998. Ad Hoc in Albania: Did Europe Fail? A Rejoinder. Security Dialogue, 29(2), pp. 213–217.
 Anarchy in Albania: Collapse of European Collective Security?
 "Modern Albania: From Dictatorship to Democracy", Fred C. Abrahams, 2015, NYU Press
 "False Apocalypse: From Stalinism to Capitalism", Fatos Lubonja, 2014, Istros Books
 "Rënia e Demokracisë", Afrim Krasniqi, 1998, Eurorilindja 
 "Shqipëria jashtë Veriut and Jugut", Ibrahim Kelmendi, 1997, Zëri i Kosovës 
 "Unë e pashë kush e dogji Vlorën", Gëzim Zilja, 2000, Pelioni 
 "Skaner 1997", Gëzim Zilja 
 "Kryengritje e tradhtuar", Panajot Barka 
 "Lufta jo civile", Preç Zogaj 
 "Humnerë ‘97", Bashkim Fino 
 "Viti ‘97, Prapaskenat e krizës që rrënuan shtetin''", Mero Baze, 2010, Toena

External links
 Albanian Civil War (1997) - GlobalSecurity.org
 AP Video Archive on 1997 in Albania
 Documentary of Cerrik Massacre with footage of hostage officers
 Met Bozi in court
 The Pyramid Scheme that Collapsed a Nation

 
Conflicts in 1997
Civil wars involving the states and peoples of Europe
1997 in Albania
Mass murder in 1997
Massacres in Albania
20th-century rebellions
Pyramid and Ponzi schemes
Wars involving Albania
Riots and civil disorder in Albania
Political controversies in Albania
Modern history of Albania
Organized crime conflicts in Albania
Looting in Europe
Attacks on police stations in the 1990s